Muhammad Raza Khan (Urdu:محمد رضا خان) is a former Federal Secretary, Ministry of Law, Justice and Human Rights and a retired Chief Justice of Peshawar High Court. He was born in District Mansehra, Khyber Pakhtunkhwa on 8 August 1946.

Education
After graduating from the University of Peshawar in 1967, Khan went on to get double masters from the same university, firstly in political science in 1969, and English literature in 1971. After that, he obtained his LLB degree, also from the University of Peshawar in 1973, where he not only received a gold medal, but was also awarded with the President of Pakistan Award.

Overseas trainings

In 1988 he attended a training workshop on the role of middle management in Turkey. In 1990, he proceeded to London to attend a training on British Parliamentary Commissioners Organizational setup & Procedure at the Parliamentary Commissioners Office, United Kingdom. In 2000, Khan attended a workshop on enforcement of intellectual property rights organized by the World Intellectual Property Organization (WIPO), Tehran, Iran.

Judicial and executive experience
After passing the competitive examination, Khan joined the PCS (Judicial Branch) in 1975, as a Civil Judge, and was promoted as Senior Civil Judge in 1977. In 1980, he was made the Additional District & Sessions Judge and thereafter District & Sessions Judge in 1982. Upon the creation of the office of Ombudsmen in Pakistan Wafaqi Mohtasib secretariat he took charge as Director in 1983 and was subsequently promoted as Director General (Complaints) and held the post between 1987-1994. Between 1994-1995, he was appointed as Secretary, Attorney-General for Pakistan Office of Attorney-General of Pakistan (AGFP). In 1994, he was appointed as Member, Federal Service Tribunal Federal Service Tribunal and he held this office till 1998. He assumed his duties at the Ministry of Law, Justice and Human Rights as Joint Secretary, in the year 2000 and was serving in the same capacity, till 2004, when he was elevated as Judge, Peshawar High Court. While still in service, in 2007, he was appointed as Federal Secretary, Ministry of Law, Justice and Human Rights and after keeping that charge, for little over a year, in 2008 he was elevated and sworn in as the Chief Justice, Peshawar High Court from where he retired upon attaining the age of superannuation, on 8 August 2008.

Post-retirement Honors
After laying down the robes, in 2010 Khan was given the task to serve the Parliament of Pakistan as a Constitutional Expert, 18th Amendment Implementation Commission between 2010-2011. After successful completion of tenure in 2011, Khan joined the office of Ombudsmen in Pakistan as Senior Advisor, Federal Ombudsman. In 2012, he assumed office, for the second time,  as  Federal Secretary,  Ministry of Law, Justice and Human Rights and held that charge till late 2013 when he was appointed as Special Secretary, Ministry of Law, Justice and Human Rights till his tenure completed in April 2016, As the Law Secretary, Mr.Khan, was also holding portfolio of Member, Law & Justice Commission of Pakistan. In 2016, he was given the charge as Member, Council of Islamic Ideology which he is still holding.

References

External links
 National Assembly of Pakistan
 Peshawar High Court, Peshawar
 Home Page
 WAFAQI MOHTASIB (OMBUDSMAN)'S SECRETARIAT
 Law and Justice Commission of Pakistan

Living people
Hindkowan people
1946 births
Pakistani judges
People from Mansehra District
University of Peshawar alumni
Chief Justices of the Peshawar High Court